Werner Prantl was an Austrian luger who competed in the late 1970s and early 1980s. A natural track luger, he won one gold (Singles: 1979) and three bronzes (Singles: 1982, Doubles: 1979, 1982) at the FIL World Luge Natural Track Championships.

Prantl also won two medals at the FIL European Luge Natural Track Championships with a gold in doubles (1979) and a silver singles (1978).

References
Natural track European Championships results 1970-2006.
Natural track World Championships results: 1979-2007

Austrian male lugers
Year of birth missing (living people)
Living people